Cerithiopsis matara is a species of sea snail, a gastropod in the family Cerithiopsidae, which is known from the United Kingdom Exclusive Economic Zone. It was described by Dall in 1889.

Description 
The maximum recorded shell length is 9.8 mm.

Habitat 
Minimum recorded depth is 183 m. Maximum recorded depth is 183 m.

References

matara
Gastropods described in 1889